Art Goodtimes is an American poet, farmer and politician in Colorado. Goodtimes was first elected to the San Miguel County Board of Commissioners in 1996 as a Democrat. He switched to the Green Party of Colorado in 1998 and was re-elected in 2000, 2004, 2008 and 2012, before retiring in 2016. He is a noted poet and writer of several books and the poet laureate of the Telluride Mushroom Festival. He grew up in California and graduated from San Francisco State University in 1970. He has also served as co-chair of the Green Party of Colorado.

References

Year of birth missing (living people)
Living people
Colorado Greens
Colorado Democrats
Writers from Colorado
Poets from Colorado
People from San Miguel County, Colorado
San Francisco State University alumni
Farmers from Colorado
Green Party of the United States officeholders